Kyle Hall (born September 5, 1990) is a businessman and politician, currently serving in the North Carolina House of Representatives.

Early life

Hall was born September 5, 1990, and raised in Stokes County, North Carolina. He was educated in North Carolina's state public school systems, beginning at Pinnacle Elementary, working his way through community college, and earning a Bachelor of Arts in political science from UNC-Chapel Hill, where he graduated in 2012.

Political career
Prior to serving in the legislature, Hall was the Communications Director for U.S. Congressman Mark Walker (NC Sixth District).

On November 23, 2015, Hall was appointed to the North Carolina House seat of NC House District 91 by Governor Pat McCrory. He was elected to his first full term in November 2016.

Hall was reelected to his seat in the North Carolina House of Representatives in November 2018.

North Carolina House of Representatives

Committee assignments
Standing or select committees (2017–2018 Session)
 Appropriations, Vice chair 
 Appropriations on Agriculture and Natural and Economic Resources, Chair 
 Appropriations on Information Technology 
 Commerce and Job Development
 Education – K–12
 Homelessness, Foster Care, and Dependency
 Insurance

Standing or select committees (2019–2020 Session)
 Agriculture
 Appropriations, Vice chair 
 Appropriations, Agriculture and Natural and Economic Resources, Chair 
 Appropriations, Information Technology, Chair 
 Commerce
 Environment
 Insurance

Electoral history

2022

2020

2018

2016

Legislation
House Bill 464, "Small Business Health Care Act", established standards for Association Health Plans (AHPs). It defined several terms and create requirements for the business associations sponsoring the AHPs,
including domicile, solvency, and operational requirements. It also created requirements for the
AHPs themselves, including coverage, premium, and non-discrimination requirements.

References

1990 births
Living people
People from Winston-Salem, North Carolina
University of North Carolina at Chapel Hill alumni
21st-century American politicians
Republican Party members of the North Carolina House of Representatives